This is a list of Catholic churches in Bolivia.

Cathedrals
See: List of cathedrals in Bolivia
Sucre Cathedral

Basilicas
Basilica of Our Lady of Copacabana

Other churches

See also
List of Roman Catholic dioceses in Bolivia

 
Bolivia, Catholic
Bolivia
Lists of religious buildings and structures in Bolivia